Lewis Teague (born March 8, 1938) is an American film director, whose work includes Alligator, Cat's Eye, Cujo, The Jewel of the Nile, The Dukes of Hazzard: Reunion!, Navy SEALs and Wedlock.

Biography
Teague was born in Brooklyn, New York. Teague fell in love with films at age 14 when he saw The Steel Helmet (1951)

He dropped out of high school at age 17 and enrolled in the army, serving for three years in Germany. He studied film at New York University, where his short films included Sound and the Painter (1962) and It's About a Carpenter, which was circulated through public libraries. In 1963 he won a scholarship for being the most promising student at the school.

He left the school in 1963 without completing a degree when he was offered a job working on The Alfred Hitchcock Hour. (Teague returned to NYU to complete his degree in 2016, at the age of 78.)

Early career
Teague had an early directing credit with the episode "The Second Verdict" on The Alfred Hitchcock Hour (1964).

He later said he "dropped out" and ran the Cinemateque 16, an underground movie theater in L.A., for a couple of years until he "got bored, and returned to filmmaking." He provided a film segment for a theatre production of The Disenchanted (1968), which the Los Angeles Times described as "effective".

Teague was a production assistant on Loving (1970) and a production manager on the rock concert documentary Woodstock (1970). He was cinematographer on Bongo Wolf's Revenge (1970).

He was announced as director for Loves as a Cop but it appears to have not been made.

He edited a surfing documentary Forgotten Island of Santosha (1974) and made his debut as a feature director with Dirty O'Neil (1974), which he co-directed.

Roger Corman
In 1974 Teague was employed by Roger Corman at New World Pictures at the recommendation of Martin Scorsese who had also been to NYU. He edited Cockfighter (1974); was second unit director and assistant editor on Death Race 2000 (1975); edited Crazy Mama (1975) for Jonathan Demme; assistant director on Thunder and Lightning (1977) (made for Corman but at 20th Century Fox); and was responsible for the avalanche sequence in Avalanche (1978).

Teague later said, "The main things you learn by working for Corman are how to get every nickel on the screen, how to be as expedient as possible, and how to work very quickly. Also, Roger is an extremely clever person. Even though most of his material was exploitive, he always had a very intelligent approach. I learned a lot from the way he dealt with directors and editors. He was extremely well-organized, very insightful, very quick to make decisions."

Outside of New World he edited Summer Run (1974) and the Oscar-winning short documentary Number Our Days (1976).

Director
Teague returned to directing with The Lady in Red (1979), for New World Pictures, based on a script by John Sayles. It starred Robert Conrad, who got Teague a job directing an episode of the TV series A Man Called Sloane. He also did episodes of Vega$ and Barnaby Jones and was the Second-Unit Director on Samuel Fuller's World War II movie, The Big Red One (1980).

Teague's second feature as sole credit was Alligator (1980), based on a script by Sayles.

He did an episode of Riker then helmed the vigilante film Fighting Back (1982) and was called in at the last minute to do a Stephen King adaptation, Cujo (1983). It was popular and Teague was offered a second King script, Cat's Eye (1985).

Teague had his biggest budget to date with The Jewel of the Nile (1985), a sequel to Romancing the Stone (1984).

There was a gap in films, before Teague returned with Collision Course (1989), which he was brought on to at the last minute. He returned to television with Shannon's Deal (1989), based on a script by Sayles.

1990s
Teague directed Navy Seals (1990), followed by Wedlock (1991) and T Bone N Weasel (1992).

He did episodes of Time Trax (the pilot), Fortune Hunter, Profiler, and Nash Bridges, and did some TV movies: OP Center (1995), Saved by the Light (1995),Justice League of America (1997) (doing uncredited work), The Dukes of Hazzard: Reunion! (1997), Love and Treason (2001), and The Triangle (2001).

Later career
After a five-year absence from directing, Teague directed (as well as wrote and produced) the dramatic short Cante Jondo (2007).

Teague has experimented with digital filmmaking,  working on a reality-based sitcom series in digital format about CharlottaTS (a transsexual from Barcelona), Carlotta T-S (2010).

He was the Director of Photography and Co-Editor on the 2014 short, Clifford Goes Boom.

Filmography

References

External links

Film directors from New York City
Horror film directors
1938 births
Living people
People from Brooklyn